Hurricane Maria devastated the entire island of Puerto Rico in September 2017 and caused a major humanitarian crisis. Originally, a powerful Category 5 hurricane, Maria was the strongest storm to impact the island in nearly 90 years. Maria made landfall on Puerto Rico on September 20 as a high-end Category 4 storm, bringing a large storm surge, very heavy rains, and wind gusts well above . It flattened neighborhoods, crippled the island's power grid, and caused an estimated 2,982 fatalities and US$90 billion in damage.

Background

Hurricane Irma's effect

Still recovering from Hurricane Irma, which had hit the island just two weeks earlier, approximately 80,000 people were still without power as Maria approached.

Storm history up to landfall

Favorable conditions allowed the storm to strengthen throughout the day, and a convective burst over the center propelled Maria to hurricane strength late on September 17.

Maria made its closest approach to St. Croix around 05:00 UTC on September 20, passing within  of the island; the storm's outer eyewall lashed the island, but the inner eyewall remained offshore. Hours later, the outer eyewall hit Vieques, an island off of Puerto Rico's eastern coast. By this time, an eyewall replacement cycle had caused Maria to weaken to Category 4 strength. It was the second strongest recorded hurricane to hit the island, surpassed only by the 1928 San Felipe Segundo hurricane, the only Category 5 hurricane to strike Puerto Rico.

Infrastructure and recession
The Puerto Rico Electric Power Authority (PREPA), whose debt had already reached $9 billion before the hurricanes, eventually filed for bankruptcy. Furthermore, the company has lost 30 percent of its employees since 2012. Aging infrastructure across the island makes the grid more susceptible to damage from storms; the median age of PREPA power plants is 44 years. The company's safety record is also not up to par, and local newspapers frequently describe poor maintenance and outdated controls.

In the decade preceding Maria, Puerto Rico suffered from major financial decline and crippling debt from poor fiscal management. Early in 2017, the territory filed for bankruptcy as its public debt reached $74 billion. A change in taxation policy prompted an exodus of lucrative business and reduced tax revenue; unemployment rates reached 45 percent.

Preparations

Forecasts of Hurricane Marias track from the National Hurricane Center proved to be "highly accurate," with the agency's second advisory—issued on September 16—predicting it would strike Puerto Rico as a major hurricane.

Evacuation orders were issued in Puerto Rico in advance of Maria, and officials announced that 450 shelters would open in the afternoon of September 18. As of September 19, at least 2,000 people in Puerto Rico had sought shelter.

Impact

Hurricane Maria made landfall in Puerto Rico on Wednesday, September 20. Widespread flooding, waist-deep in some areas, affected San Juan, and the roof was blown off of numerous structures. San Juan's coastal La Perla neighborhood was largely destroyed. Cataño saw extensive damage, with the Juana Matos neighborhood estimated to be 80 percent destroyed. Luis Muñoz Marín International Airport, San Juan's primary airport, was slated to reopen on September 22.

Extensive damage occurred to hundreds of thousands of buildings throughout Puerto Rico due to high winds, heavy rainfall, storm surge, wave action and landslides. Ricardo Rosselló estimated that over 300,000 homes had been destroyed and many more damaged across the commonwealth. Other estimates included 166,000 residential buildings damaged or destroyed and 472,000 housing units having received major damage or having been destroyed.

More than 2,000 people were rescued when military relief reached the town. At least eight people died due to the flooding while many are unaccounted for.

The hurricane completely destroyed the island's power grid, leaving all 3.4 million residents without electricity. Puerto Rican governor Ricardo Rosselló stated that it could take months to restore power in some locations, with San Juan Mayor Carmen Yulín Cruz estimating that some areas would remain without power for four to six months. Communication networks were crippled across the island. Ninety-five percent of cell networks were down with 48 of the island's 78 counties' networks rendered completely inoperable.  Eighty-five per cent of above-ground phone and internet cables were knocked out.  Only one radio station, WAPA 680 AM, remained on-air through the storm.

The NEXRAD Doppler weather radar of Puerto Rico had also been literally blown away. The radome which covers the radar antenna, was destroyed in the 130-mph winds, and the 30-foot-wide radar dish was blown from the pedestal, which remained intact. The radar is located at an elevation of 2,800 feet and the anemometer at the site measured winds of about 145 mph before communications broke, which means winds at that height were likely 20 percent higher than what was seen at sea level, possibly reaching Category 5 levels. Its replacement will take a few months.

The nearby island of Vieques suffered similarly extensive damage. Communications were largely lost across the island. There was widespread property damage and many structures were leveled. The remaining structures on the island of Culebra were extremely vulnerable to Maria's powerful winds after having recently experienced major damage due to Hurricane Irma, causing the complete destruction of many wooden houses, along with blown off roofs and sunken boats.

The recreational boat Ferrel, carrying a family of four, issued a distress signal while battling  seas and  winds on September 20. Communications with the vessel were lost near Vieques on September 20. The United States Coast Guard, United States Navy, and British Royal Navy conducted search-and-rescue operations utilizing an HC-130 aircraft, a fast response cutter,  and Navy helicopters. On September 21, the mother and her two children were rescued, but the father drowned inside the capsized ship.

Maria's Category 4 winds broke a  line feed antenna of the Arecibo Observatory. It fell  puncturing the dish below, greatly reducing its functionality until repairs can be made.

Maria caused many factories in Puerto Rico to close, including factories that make IV bags. This led to a shortage of IV bags on the mainland, exacerbating an H3N2 outbreak that killed at least 30 children.

Damage estimates and economic impact

On September 24, Governor Rosselló estimated that the damage from Hurricane Maria in Puerto Rico exceeded the $8 billion damage by Hurricane Georges. He later estimated that Maria caused at least US$ 90 billion in damage. Approximately 80 percent of the territory's agriculture was destroyed by the hurricane; losses are estimated at $780 million. Plantains, bananas and coffee farms were severely damaged and more than 90% of Puerto Rico's poultry was destroyed.

Emotional impact

Many people were not equipped to handle the lasting effects of the damage this storm wrought on the island. Food and potable water were hard to come by, even months after the storm, compounding feelings of hopelessness and helplessness. Blackouts ravaged the island after the hurricane hit, knocking out power to hospitals which stretched the healthcare system. Patients noted that their services were cut down, while healthcare providers called out the Puerto Rican government for "abandoning" them during a stressing time. New and expecting mothers experienced a greater exposure risk to health issues because Hurricane Maria created an environment for pathogens and environmental toxins to thrive.

Survivors have stated they will never forget it. Suicide rates spiked after Hurricane Maria, especially among the elderly. Cases of depression also increased and, in some cases, lead to weight loss. Some still feel the emotional effects while looking at pictures or recounting stories. For the young people on the island, witnessing the aftermath has left them with high levels of posttraumatic stress disorder. The number of indirect deaths from the stormed greatly surpassed that of direct deaths from Maria, but also the direct and indirect deaths of Hurricanes Harvey and Irma which made landfall around the same time.

Anxiety was high among survivors as well, with many fearing health issues and injuries. On the western side of the island, it was rumored that water was being pumped by AAA to homes from Guajataca. The damage to the reservoir and further rumors that the lake was going to run dry increased levels of anxiety in residents of the region. When water service finally returned, it was unreliable and many still depended on bottled water.

Impact on gender-based violence 
The long lines to access vital resources increased numbers of sexual harassment against women; furthermore the lack of government resources for employment and housing made it difficult for women facing domestic abuse to escape, increasing the likelihood of becoming a victim of intimate partner violence (IPV). A record number of 23 women were murdered and classified as IPV in 2018, and the numbers went up each year after. The intimate partner violence rate in Puerto Rico jumped to 1.7 per 100,000 women in 2018, while the rate was 0.77 per 100,000 in 2017.

Death toll 

In the months following Maria, media outlets, politicians, and investigative journalists questioned the official death toll of 64 from the Government of Puerto Rico. A two-week investigation in November 2017 by CNN of 112 funeral homes—approximately half of the island—revealed 499 hurricane-related deaths between September 20 and October 19. Funeral homes became so overwhelmed by the number of bodies that in one instance a facility's director in Vega Alta died from a stress-induced heart attack. Two scientists, Alexis Santos and Jeffrey Howard, estimated the death toll in Puerto Rico to be 1,085 by the end of November 2017. They utilized average monthly deaths and the spike in fatalities following the hurricane. The value only accounted for reported deaths, and with limitations to communication the actual toll could have been even higher. By the end of November, the Puerto Rican government maintained that their report of 55 fatalities was the most accurate despite ample contrary evidence collected by media and investigative journalists. Utilizing a similar method, The New York Times indicated an increase of 1,052 fatalities in the 42 days following Maria compared to previous years. Significant spikes in causes deaths compared to the two preceding Septembers included sepsis (+47%), pneumonia (+45%), emphysema (+43%), diabetes (+31%), and Alzheimer's and Parkinson's (+23%). Robert Anderson at the National Center for Health Statistics conveyed the increase in monthly fatalities was statistically significant and likely driven in some capacity by Hurricane Maria.

By mid-December Governor Rossello ordered a recount and new analysis of the official death toll. On August 28, 2018, the Government of Puerto Rico revised the official death toll to be 2,975 people, ranking Maria as one of the deadliest hurricanes in United States history. The official estimate is based on a study commissioned by the governor of Puerto Rico.

Aftermath

The power grid was effectively destroyed by the hurricane, leaving millions without electricity. Governor Ricardo Rosselló estimated that Maria caused at least 90 billion dollars in damage. As of September 26, 95% of the island was without power, less than half the population had tap water, and 95% of the island had no cell phone service. On October 6, a little more than two weeks after the hurricane, 89% still had no power, 44% had no water service, and 58% had no cell service.  One month after the hurricane, 88% of the island was without power (about 3 million people), 29% lacked tap water (about 1 million people), and 40% of the island had no cell service. Three months after the hurricane, 45% of Puerto Ricans still had no power, over 1.5 million people.  Fourteen percent of Puerto Rico had no tap water; cell service was returning with over 90% of service restored and 86% of cell towers functioning.

Two weeks after the hurricane, international relief organization Oxfam chose to intervene for the first time on American soil since Hurricane Katrina in 2005.

One month after the hurricane, all hospitals were open, but most were on backup generators that provide limited power. About half of sewage treatment plants on the island were still not functioning. FEMA reported 60,000 homes needed roofing help, and had distributed 38,000 roofing tarps.  The island's highways and bridges remained heavily damaged nearly a month later. Only 392 miles of Puerto Rico's 5,073 miles of road were open. A month later, some towns continued to be isolated and delivery of relief supplies including food and water were hampered—helicopters were the only alternative.

As of October 1, there were ongoing fuel shortage and distribution problems, with 720 of 1,100 gas stations open.

The Guajataca Dam was structurally damaged, and on September 22, the National Weather Service issued a flash flood emergency for parts of the area in response. Tens of thousands of people were ordered to evacuate the area, with about 70,000 thought to be at risk.

The entirety of Puerto Rico was declared a Federal Disaster Zone shortly after the hurricane. The Federal Emergency Management Agency planned to open an air bridge with three to four aircraft carrying essential supplies to the island daily starting on September 22. Beyond flights involving the relief effort, limited commercial traffic resumed at Luis Muñoz Marín International Airport on September 22 under primitive conditions. A dozen commercial flights operated daily as of September 26. By October 3, there were 39 commercial flights per day from all Puerto Rican airports, about a quarter of the normal number.  The next day, airports were reported to be operating at normal capacity.  In marked contrast to the initial relief efforts for Hurricane Katrina and the 2010 Haiti earthquake, on September 22, the only signs of relief efforts were beleaguered Puerto Rican government employees. The territory's government contracted 56 small companies to assist in restoring power.  Eight FEMA Urban Search & Rescue (US&R) teams were deployed to assist in rescue efforts.

On September 24, the amphibious assault ship  and the dock landing ship  under Rear Admiral Jeffrey W. Hughes along with the 2,400 marines of the 26th Marine Expeditionary Unit arrived to assist in relief efforts. By September 24, there were 13 United States Coast Guard ships deployed around Puerto Rico assisting in the relief and restoration efforts: the National Security Cutter USCGC James; the medium endurance cutters USCGC Diligence, USCGC Forward, USCGC Venturous, and USCGC Valiant; the fast response cutters USCGC Donald Horsley, USCGC Heriberto Hernandez, USCGC Joseph Napier, USCGC Richard Dixon, and USCGC Winslow Griesser; the coastal patrol boat USCGC Yellowfin; and the seagoing buoy tenders USCGC Cypress and USCGC Elm. Federal aid arrived on September 25 with the reopening of major ports. Eleven cargo vessels collectively carrying 1.3 million liters of water, 23,000 cots, and dozens of generators arrived. Full operations at the ports of Guayanilla, Salinas, and Tallaboa resumed on September 25, while the ports of San Juan, Fajardo, Culebra, Guayama, and Vieques had limited operations. The United States Air Force Air Mobility Command has dedicated eight C-17 Globemaster aircraft to deliver relief supplies. The Air Force assisted the Federal Aviation Administration with air traffic control repairs to increase throughput capacity.

The United States Transportation Command moved additional personnel and eight U.S. Army UH-60 Black Hawk helicopters from Fort Campbell, Kentucky to Luis Muñoz Marín International Airport to increase distribution capacity. The United States Army Corps of Engineers deployed 670 personnel engaged in assessing and restoring the power grid; as of September 25, 83 generators were installed and an additional 186 generators were en route.   As of September 26, agencies of the U.S. government had delivered 4 million meals, 6 million liters of water, 70,000 tarps and 15,000 rolls of roof sheeting. National Guard troops were activated and deployed to Puerto Rico from Connecticut, Georgia, Iowa, Illinois, Kentucky, Missouri, New York, Rhode Island, and Wisconsin.

On September 29, the hospital ship  left port at Norfolk, Virginia to help victims of Hurricanes Irma and Maria, and arrived in San Juan on October 3. A couple of days later, the Comfort departed on an around the island tour to assist, remaining a dozen miles off shore.  Patients were brought to the ship by helicopter or boat tender after being referred by Puerto Rico's Department of Health. However, most of the 250 bed floating state-of-the-art hospital went unused despite overburdened island clinics and hospitals because there were few referrals.  Governor Rosselló explained on or about October 17 that "The disconnect or the apparent disconnect was in the communications flow" and added "I asked for a complete revision of that so that we can now start sending more patients over there." After remaining offshore for three weeks, the Comfort docked in San Juan on October 27, briefly departing only once to restock at sea from a naval resupply ship. As of November 8, the Comfort's staff had treated 1,476 patients, including 147 surgeries and two births.

On September 27, the Pentagon reopened two major airfields on Puerto Rico and started sending aircraft, specialized units, and a hospital ship to assist in the relief effort; Brigadier General Richard C. Kim, the deputy commanding general of United States Army North, was responsible for coordinating operations between the military, FEMA and other government agencies, and the private sector. Massive amounts of water, food, and fuel either had been delivered to ports in Puerto Rico or were held up at ports in the mainland United States because there was a lack of truck drivers to move the goods into the interior; the lack of communication networks hindered the effort as only 20% of drivers reported to work. As of September 28, the Port of San Juan had only been able to dispatch 4% of deliveries received and had very little room to accept additional shipments. As of September 28, 44 percent of the population remained without drinking water and the U.S. military was shifting from "a short term, sea-based response to a predominantly land-based effort designed to provide robust, longer term support" with fuel delivery a top priority. A joint Army National Guard and Marine expeditionary unit (MEU) team established an Installation Staging Base at the former Roosevelt Roads Naval Station; they transported via helicopter Department of Health and Human Services assessment teams to hospitals across Puerto Rico to determine medical requirements.  On September 29, the amphibious assault ship USS Wasp which had been providing relief activities to the island of Dominica was diverted to Puerto Rico. As of September 30, FEMA official Alejandro de la Campa stated that 5% of electricity, 33% of the telecommunications infrastructure, and 50% of water services had been restored to the island.

On September 28, 2017, Lieutenant General Jeffrey S. Buchanan was dispatched to Puerto Rico to lead all military hurricane relief efforts there and to see how the military could be more effective in the recovery effort, particularly in dealing with the thousands of containers of supplies that were stuck in port because of "red tape, lack of drivers, and a crippling power outage". On September 29 he stated that there were not enough troops and equipment in place but more would be arriving soon.

With centralized fossil-fuel-based power plants and grid infrastructure expected to be out of commission for weeks to months, some renewable energy projects were in the works, including the shipment of hundreds of Tesla Powerwall battery systems to be integrated with solar PV systems and Sonnen solar microgrid projects at 15 emergency community centers; the first were expected to be completed in October.    In addition, other solar companies jumped into help, including Sunnova and New Start Solar. A charity called Light Up Puerto Rico raised money to both purchase and deliver solar products, including solar panels, on October 19.

Many TV and movie stars donated money to hurricane relief organizations to help the victims of Harvey and Maria. Prominently, Jennifer Aniston pledged a million U.S. dollars, dividing the amount equally between the Red Cross and The Ricky Martin Foundation for Puerto Rico. Martin's foundation had raised over three million dollars as of October 13.

On October 10, 2017, Carnival Cruise Lines announced that it would resume departures of cruises from San Juan on October 15, 2017. On October 13, both CNN and The Guardian reported that Puerto Ricans were drinking water that was being pumped from a well at an EPA Superfund site; the water was later determined to be safe to drink.

On October 13, the Trump administration requested $4.9 billion to fund a loan program that Puerto Rico could use to address basic functions and infrastructure needs. As of October 20, only 18.5% of the island had electricity, 49.1% of cell towers were working, and 69.5% of customers had running water, with the slowest restoration in the north. Ports and commercial flights were back to normal operations, but 7.6% of USPS locations, 11.5% of supermarkets, and 21.4% of gas stations were still closed.  4,246 people were still living in emergency shelters, and tourism was down by half. As of November 5, more than 100,000 people had left Puerto Rico for the mainland. A December 17 report indicated that 600 people remained in shelters while 130,000 had left the island to go to the mainland.

Possible leptospirosis outbreak

An outbreak of leptospirosis may have affected survivors in the weeks following the hurricane. The bacterial infection is contracted through water contaminated with animal urine, with an incubation period of 2 to 30 days. Since large areas of Puerto Rico were without tap water, residents were forced to use other sources of water that may be contaminated, such as local streams. By October 23, four people were suspected of having died from the disease while 74 others were suspected of being infected.  There were 18 confirmed cases, 4 confirmed deaths and 99 suspected cases by November 7. Puerto Rico averages 5 cases of leptospirosis per month under normal conditions. Despite the possibility of an outbreak, officials did not deem the situation being as dire.

Recovery in 2018 

Puerto Rico is a major manufacturer of medical devices and pharmaceuticals, with this sector representing 30% of its economy.  Its factories either shut down or were greatly in reduced production because of the hurricane, and have been slowly recovering since. This caused a months-long shortage of some medical supplies in the United States, especially IV bags.  Small IV bags often come prefilled with saline or common drugs in solution, and have forced health care providers to find alternative methods of drug delivery. In January 2018, when the shortage was projected to ease, flu season came and lead to a spike in demand.

By the end of January 2018, approximately 450,000 people remained without power island-wide. On February 11, an explosion and fire damaged a power substation in Monacillo, causing a large blackout in northern parts of the island including San Juan, Trujillo Alto, Guaynabo, Carolina, Caguas, and Juncos. Cascading outages affected areas powered by substations in Villa Bettina and Quebrada Negrito.

Recovery after 2018
In 2018, electric and water service was restored to most of the island, though outages continued. In 2020, FEMA officials indicated that the island was not prepared for another hurricane.

By four years after the storm, most of the reconstruction work had not been begun, let alone completed. As of September 2021, FEMA had only delivered 18% of funds allocated for the island. As of 2021, of the 19,558 homes affected by the hurricane which requested financial assistance, only 1,651 had been repaired or remodeled. On September 23, 2021, the governor Pedro Pierluisi stated the government had identified 7,060 homes in 39 municipalities which lost their roofs during the hurricane and still used blue tarps.

Criticism of U.S. government response

The U.S. Department of Homeland Security (DHS) did not immediately waive the Jones Act for Puerto Rico, which prevented the commonwealth from receiving any aid and supplies from non-U.S.-flagged vessels from U.S. ports (ships arriving direct from non-US ports were not subject to the Act). A DHS Security spokesman said that there would be enough U.S. shipping for Puerto Rico, and that the limiting factors would be port capacity and local transport capacity.  The Jones Act was waived for a period of ten days starting on September 28 following a formal request by Puerto Rico Governor Rosselló.

San Juan Mayor Carmen Yulín Cruz called the disaster a "terrifying humanitarian crisis" and on September 26 pleaded for relief efforts to be sped up. The White House contested claims that the administration was not responding effectively. General Joseph L. Lengyel, Chief of the National Guard Bureau, defended the Trump Administration's response, and reiterated that relief efforts were hampered by Puerto Rico being an island rather than on the mainland. President Donald Trump responded to accusations that he does not care about Puerto Rico: "Puerto Rico is very important to me, and Puerto Ricothe people are fantastic people. I grew up in New York, so I know many people from Puerto Rico. I know many Puerto Ricans. And these are great people, and we have to help them. The island is devastated."

Frustrated with the federal government's "slow and inadequate response", relief group Oxfam announced on October 2 that it planned to get involved in the humanitarian aid effort, sending a team to "assess a targeted and effective response" and support its local partners' on-the-ground efforts. The same day, the group released this statement: "While the US government is engaged in relief efforts, it has failed to address the most urgent needs. Oxfam has monitored the response in Puerto Rico closely, and we are outraged at the slow and inadequate response the US Government has mounted," said Oxfam America's president Abby Maxman. "Oxfam rarely responds to humanitarian emergencies in the US and other wealthy countries, but as the situation in Puerto Rico worsens and the federal government's response continues to falter, we have decided to step in. The US has more than enough resources to mobilize an emergency response, but has failed to do so in a swift and robust manner." In an update on October 19, the agency called the situation in Puerto Rico "unacceptable" and called for "a more robust and efficient response from the US government".

On October 3, 2017, President Trump visited Puerto Rico. He compared the damage from Hurricane Maria to that of Hurricane Katrina, saying: "If you looked — every death is a horror, but if you look at a real catastrophe like Katrina, and you look at the tremendous hundreds and hundreds and hundreds of people that died, and you look at what happened here with really a storm that was just totally overbearing, nobody has seen anything like this (...) What is your death count as of this morning, 17?". Trump's remarks were widely criticized for implying that Hurricane Maria was not a "real catastrophe".  While in Puerto Rico, Trump also distributed canned goods and paper towels to crowds gathered at a relief shelter and told the residents of the devastated island "I hate to tell you, Puerto Rico, but you've thrown our budget a little out of whack, because we've spent a lot of money on Puerto Rico, and that's fine. We saved a lot of lives."

On October 12, Trump tweeted, "We cannot keep FEMA, the Military & the First Responders, who have been amazing (under the most difficult circumstances) in P.R. forever!", prompting further criticism from lawmakers in both parties; Mayor Cruz replied, "You are incapable of empathy and frankly simply cannot get the job done." In response to a request for clarification on the tweet from Governor Rosselló, John F. Kelly assured that no resources were being pulled and replied: "Our country will stand with those American citizens in Puerto Rico until the job is done".

After visiting Puerto Rico about two months after the hurricane, Refugees International issued a report that severely criticized the slow response of the federal authorities, noted poor coordination and logistics, and indicated the island was still in an emergency mode and in need of more help.

Whitefish Contract 

Soon after the hurricane struck, Whitefish Energy, a small Montana-based company with only two full-time employees, was awarded a $300 million contract by PREPA, Puerto Rico's state-run power company, to repair Puerto Rico's power grid, a move considered by many to be highly unusual for several reasons. The company contracted more than 300 personnel, most of them subcontractors, and sent them to the island to carry out work. PREPA cited Whitefish comparatively small upfront cost of $3.7 million for mobilization as one of the main reasons for contracting them over larger companies. PREPA Executive Director Ricardo Ramos stated: "Whitefish was the only company – it was the first that could be mobilized to Puerto Rico. It did not ask us to be paid soon or a guarantee to pay". No requests for assistance had been made to the American Public Power Association by October 24. The decision to hire such a tiny company was considered highly unusual by many, such as former Energy Department official Susan Tierney, who stated: "The fact that there are so many utilities with experience in this and a huge track record of helping each other out, it is at least odd why [the utility] would go to Whitefish". Several representatives, both Democrats and Republicans, also voiced their concern over the choice to contract Whitefish instead of other companies. As the company was based in Whitefish, Montana, the hometown of US Interior Secretary Ryan Zinke, and one of Zinke's sons had once done a summer internship at Whitefish, Zinke knew Whitefish's CEO personally. These facts led to accusations of privatization and cronyism, though Zinke dismissed these claims and stated that he had no role in securing the contract. In addition, Donald Trump himself, not just his cabinet, may having been involved in Whitefish obtaining the contract, as Whitefish's primary investor, HBC Investments, was founded by a prominent donor of Donald Trump.

In a press release on October 27, FEMA stated it did not approve of PREPA's contract with Whitefish and cited "significant concerns". Governor Rosselló subsequently ordered an audit of the contract's budget. DHS Inspector General John Roth led the FEMA audit while Governor Rosselló called for a second review by Puerto Rico's Office of Management and Budget. The governor then demanded that the contract be cancelled; this was executed on October 29.

See also

 1928 San Felipe Segundo hurricane – only Category 5 hurricane landfall on record in Puerto Rico
 1899 San Ciriaco hurricane – deadliest hurricane in the history of Puerto Rico
 1932 San Ciprian hurricane – last hurricane to make landfall in Puerto Rico at Category 4 strength or higher.
 Hurricane Georges in 1998 – the last major hurricane to strike Puerto Rico

References

Hurricane Maria
Hurricane Maria 2017
Hurricane Maria in Puerto Rico
Maria 2017
Maria in Puerto Rico